A cheese and pickle sandwich (sometimes known as a cheese and chutney sandwich or a ploughman's sandwich from its resemblance to a ploughman's lunch) is a British sandwich. As its name suggests, it consists of sliced or grated cheese (typically Cheddar) and pickle (a sweet, vinegary chutney, the most popular brand being Branston), sandwiched between two slices of bread. The ratio of cheese-to-pickle may vary according to personal taste. The inside surfaces of the bread slices may be spread with butter or margarine, and the sandwich may include salad items such as lettuce and rocket (U.S., arugula).

An informal poll by the German supermarket chain ALDI saw it voted as Britain's favourite sandwich. Celebrity chefs such as Jamie Oliver, Anthony Worrall Thompson and the Hairy Bikers have produced their own recipes for the sandwich. Oliver attributes the sandwich's popularity to the way in which "the crunch of the pickle perfectly complements the smooth softness of the cheese, and the vinegariness of the pickle balances the richness of the cheese."

See also

References

British sandwiches
English cuisine
Cheese sandwiches